Basel St. Johann railway station is a railway station in inner-city Basel, Switzerland. It is an intermediate stop on the standard gauge Strasbourg–Basel line of SNCF.

Services
The following services stop at Basel St. Johann:

References

External links 
 
 

Railway stations in Basel-Stadt
Swiss Federal Railways stations
France–Switzerland border crossings